It Happened at the World's Fair is a 1963 American musical film starring Elvis Presley as a crop-dusting pilot. It was filmed in Seattle, Washington, site of the Century 21 Exposition. The governor of Washington at the time, Albert Rosellini, suggested the setting to Metro-Goldwyn-Mayer executives. The film made $2.25 million at the box office. It marked Kurt Russell's film debut.

Plot
Pilot Mike Edwards finds himself in a dilemma. His partner and friend, Danny, has overspent the money that Mike had set aside to pay their debts. Without it, their aircraft called Bessie, a Boeing-Stearman Model 75 crop duster, is taken by the local sheriff. If Mike and Danny do not get the money in a week, Bessie will be auctioned off to the highest bidder.

Mike and Danny become reluctant hitchhikers, looking for a lift to anywhere. They are picked up by apple farmer Walter Ling and his niece Sue-Lin. They end up in Seattle, Washington, location of the 1962 World's Fair. When the uncle is called away on business, Danny persuades Mike to take Sue-Lin to tour the fair. During a visit to a doctor at the fair, Mike falls for Diane Warren, an attractive but stubborn nurse who resists his advances. He gives a quarter to a boy who kicks him in the shin so that he can be treated by her. Diane's supervisor then convinces her to give Mike a ride back to his apartment, convinced that his leg is injured. Mike and Diane dine at the top of the fair's Space Needle. However, he also courts Dorothy Johnson.

Complications then arise when Walter inexplicably fails to return the next day to get Sue-Lin, leaving her with Mike. Sue-Lin feigns illness so that Diane will come to their apartment and examine her and see Mike again. When Diane discovers that Mike is not related to Sue-Lin, she wants to inform the welfare board so that Sue-Lin can be removed from Mike and Danny's apartment. A mysterious nightfall plane delivery is conducted for Mike and Danny's friend Vince, who smuggles valuable furs. The film ends with Mike and Diane in love.

Cast
 Elvis Presley as Mike Edwards, a crop-duster pilot
 Joan O'Brien as Diane Warren, a nurse and Mike's love interest
 Gary Lockwood as Danny Burke, Mike's gambling-addicted business partner
 Vicky Tiu as Sue-Lin, a young girl whom Mike befriended
 Yvonne Craig as Dorothy Johnson, another of Mike's love interests
 H. M. Wynant as Vince Bradley, Danny's crooked associate
 Kam Tong as Walter Ling, Sue-Lin's uncle
 Edith Atwater as Miss Steuben
 Guy Raymond as Barney Thatcher
 Dorothy Green as Miss Ettinger
 Kurt Russell as Boy Kicking Mike (uncredited)
Sandra Giles as Lily (uncredited)
Red West as Fred (uncredited)
Joe Esposito as Carnival Man (uncredited)

Production
The Seattle Center, including the Seattle Center Monorail and the Space Needle, serve as backdrops for several scenes. Security officers pursue Presley and the girl through the fountains at what is now the Pacific Science Center. The hitchhiking scene with Elvis and Gary Lockwood was filmed near Camarillo, California, as were some of the flying scenes. The entire hitchhiking scene, up to the point when Mike and Danny are picked up, was filmed on 5th Street near Pleasant Valley Road on the south side of Camarillo.

While The Elvis Encyclopedia believes that the Wilburton Trestle was shown in the film, further evidence points to a different location. It is actually a trestle over the White River between Enumclaw and Buckley, now demolished. The view in the film was taken at the intersection of Mud Mountain Road and Highway 410, looking southeast. Mount Rainier is visible in the background, but it cannot be seen at that angle from the Wilburton Trestle, which is larger than the White River Trestle, at six sections high. The trestle pictured in the film is only four sections high at the road crossing.

Soundtrack

Reception
Film reviewer Eugene Archer of the New York Times wrote, "Elvis Presley's budding dramatic talents have been neatly nipped in the Seattle story, which emerges as a dismal parody of the Metro-Goldwyn-Mayer musicals of old. Burdened with a dozen tuneless songs and a plot requiring him to play guardian to a mercilessly cute Chinese waif, the crooner merely swivels ingenuously through a morass of clichés." Variety wrote that "this is apt to be tedious going for all but the most confirmed of Presley's young admirers. The 10-count-'em-10 tunes he sings may be cause for rejoicing among his more ardent followers but, stacked up proportionately against the skinny story in between, it seems at least three too many ... so many warbling interruptions upset the tempo of the yarn and prevent plot and picture from gathering momentum." John L. Scott of the Los Angeles Times wrote that "it must be said that unless you're a Presley fan, the 10 songs he offers while plinking a guitar or ukulele can grow tedious, while the frivolous backgrounding story is turned on and off between tunes."

Home media
The film was released in widescreen format on Region 1 DVD by Warner Home Video on August 7, 2007.

See also
List of American films of 1963

References

Notes

Citations

Bibliography

 Guralnick, Peter, and Jorgensen, Ernst. Elvis Day by Day: The Definitive Record of His Life and Music. London: Ballantine 1999. .
 Kirchberg, Connie, and Hendrickx, Marc. Elvis Presley, Richard Nixon, and the American Dream. Jefferson, North Carolina: McFarland and Company, 1999. .
 Knight, Timothy. Elvis Presley in the Movies. New York: Metro Books, 2009. .
 Lisanti, Tom. Fantasy Femmes of 60's Cinema: Interviews with 20 Actresses from Biker, Beach, and Elvis Movies. Jefferson, North Carolina: McFarland and Company, 2000. .
 Marcus, Greil. "Rock Films," The Rolling Stone Illustrated History of Rock & Roll, second edition. New York: Random House 1980. .
 Ponce de Leon, Charles L. Fortunate Son: The Life of Elvis Presley. London: Macmillan, 2007. .
 Presley, Priscilla. Elvis and Me. New York: G.P. Putnam's Sons, 1985. .
 Thomson, David. A Biographical Dictionary of Film (3d ed.). New York: Knopf. 1998. .
 Victor, Adam. The Elvis Encyclopedia. London: Overlook Duckworth, 2008. .

DVD reviews
 "What Happened At The World’s Fair: Elvis And The Future In Seattle" by Jim Demetre at The Monarch Review, October 18, 2012.
 Review by Bill Treadway at DVD Verdict, August 12, 2004.
 Review by Mark Zimmer at digitallyOBSESSED!, August 4, 2004.

External links
 
 
 
 
 

1963 films
1963 adventure films
1963 musical films
American adventure films
American aviation films
American musical films
Century 21 Exposition
1960s English-language films
Films shot in California
Films directed by Norman Taurog
Films scored by Leith Stevens
Films set in Seattle
Films shot in Washington (state)
Metro-Goldwyn-Mayer films
World's fairs in fiction
1960s American films